Club Baloncesto Tormes is a Spanish professional basketball club based in Salamanca, Castile and León that currently plays in Liga EBA, the fourth tier of Spanish basketball.

History
CB Tormes was founded in March 2000, after splitting from UD Santa Marta, that created the basketball section in 1998.

In their first half season as independent team, the club promoted to Liga EBA, where it played two seasons before resigning to the place in the league. In the second one, CB Tormes reached the last stage of the promotion playoffs to LEB Plata, but could not achieve the promotion after losing by 30 against CB Aracena.

During all its existence, the club was alternating Liga EBA and Primera División, always resigning to the first one by financial inability.

In the 2014–15 season, CB Tormes played a new promotion playoffs, but could not win the stage.

In 2018, CB Tormes signed a collaboration agreement with Liga ACB club Baloncesto Fuenlabrada for becoming their reserve team. With this agreement, the club could achieve one of the new places in LEB Plata, third tier, after its expansion from 16 to 24 teams. However, the club could not remain in the league and was relegated at the end of the season.

Season by season

References

External links
 

Basketball teams established in 2000
Basketball teams in Castile and León
LEB Plata teams
Former Liga EBA teams
Sport in Salamanca